Atab of Kish was the tenth Sumerian king in the First Dynasty of Kish (after c. 2900 BC), according to the Sumerian king list. His successor was his son Mashda. Atab is unlikely to have existed as his name does not appear on texts dating from the period in which he was presumed to have lived (Early Dynastic period).

|-

References 

Kings of Kish
Sumerian kings